Edward Edgerly was an American politician. He served as the seventeenth mayor of Lancaster, Pennsylvania from 1888 to 1890.

References

Mayors of Lancaster, Pennsylvania
Year of birth missing
Year of death missing